Gilbert Elliot-Murray-Kynynmound, 1st Earl of Minto,  (23 April 175121 June 1814), known as Sir Gilbert Elliott, 4th Baronet until 1797, and The Lord Minto from 1797 to 1814, was a British diplomat and politician who sat in the House of Commons  between 1776 and 1795. He was viceroy of the short-lived Anglo-Corsican Kingdom from 1793 to 1796 and went on to become Governor-General of India between July 1807 and 1813.

Background and education
Minto was born in Edinburgh, the eldest son of Sir Gilbert Elliot, 3rd Baronet, and Agnes, daughter of Hugh Dalrymple-Murray-Kynynmound. He was the nephew of John Elliott, Governor of Newfoundland, Andrew Elliot the 41st Colonial Governor of New York, and of Jean Elliot the poet.

Hugh Elliot was his younger brother and Sir Charles Elliot his nephew. About 1763 Elliot and his brother Hugh were sent to Paris, where their studies were supervised by the Scottish philosopher David Hume, and where they became intimate with Honoré Mirabeau. Having passed the winters of 1766 and 1767 at the University of Edinburgh, Minto entered Christ Church, Oxford, and on quitting the university he was called to the Bar.

Career
In 1776 Minto entered Parliament as an independent Whig MP for Morpeth. He became very friendly with Edmund Burke, whom he helped in the attack on Warren Hastings and Sir Elijah Impey, and was twice an unsuccessful candidate for the office of Speaker, in the elections of January 1789 and June 1789.

In 1793 he was appointed Civil Commissioner for Dunkirk which was then under Siege of Dunkirk (1793) by Coalition forces. However, the siege proved unsuccessful and the appointment perforce remained only on paper. Later he was given a similar appointment for Toulon, which proved similarly abortive.

He was sworn of the Privy Council in 1793 and in 1794 he was appointed as viceroy of the short-lived Anglo-Corsican Kingdom. In 1797 he assumed the additional names of Murray and Kynynmound and was created Baron Minto, of Minto in the County of Roxburgh. From 1799 to 1801 he was Envoy-Extraordinary to Austria, and having been for a few months President of the Board of Control he was appointed Governor-General of India at the end of 1806, with his term starting on 31 July 1807. The district of Minto in New South Wales, Australia, (now a suburb of Sydney) was named after him in 1809. In 1810 he successfully requested the release of the British navigator, Matthew Flinders, from his six-year imprisonment on Isle of France (Mauritius). He governed until 1813, during which he expanded the British presence in the area to the Moluccas, Java, and other Dutch possessions in the East Indies during the Napoleonic Wars.  He was then created Viscount Melgund, of Melgund in the County of Forfar, and Earl of Minto, of Minto in the County of Roxburgh.

Family
Minto married Anna Maria Amyand (26 March 1752 – 8 March 1829), daughter of Sir George Amyand, 1st Baronet and sister of Lord Malmesbury, in 1777. She was known as Lady Elliot, her formal title being Countess of Minto. The ship Lady Elliot, built in Bengal, India, in 1815, inspired its captain to name an island off the Queensland coast Lady Elliot Island. The ship was probably later wrecked on Lady Elliot Reef.

Their children were:

Anna Maria (d. 18 Oct. 1855) married Lt.-Gen. Sir Rufane Shawe Donkin. No issue.
Harry Mary Frances (d. July 1825). Died young.
Gilbert, 2nd Earl Minto
Admiral the Hon. Sir George Elliot
Hon. John Elliot (b. 1788, d. 1862) was a politician.
Catherine Sarah (circa 1798-25 June 1862), who married John Boileau, 1st Baronet. Had issue.

Lord Minto died at Stevenage, Hertfordshire, on 21 June 1814, aged 63, and was buried in Westminster Abbey, along with his brother Hugh. The inscription reads:

He was succeeded in his titles by his eldest son, Gilbert.

References

Further reading
  Das, Amita; Das, Aditya.  Defending British India against Napoleon: The Foreign Policy of Governor-General Lord Minto, 1807-13 ( Rochester: Boydell Press, 2016) . online review
 

Attribution:

External links

1751 births
1814 deaths
Politicians from Edinburgh
Alumni of the University of Edinburgh
Alumni of Christ Church, Oxford
Peers of Great Britain created by George III
Earls in the Peerage of the United Kingdom
Governors-General of India
Elliot, Gilbert
Elliot, Gilbert
Elliot, Gilbert
Elliot, Gilbert
Elliot, Gilbert
Elliot, Gilbert
British rule in Indonesia
Fellows of the Royal Society
Burials at Westminster Abbey
19th-century Dutch East Indies people
Ambassadors of Great Britain to the Holy Roman Emperor
Presidents of the Board of Control